is a Japanese footballer who plays for German club FC Bayern Munich and captains the Japan women national team. She plays primarily as a defensive midfielder but has also been deployed as a central defender. 

Kumagai is one of the most successful East Asian footballers, of any gender, at club and international level. As of 2020, she has won one World Cup, seven French domestic titles, five European Cups and one Asian Games gold medal.

Club career

Kumagai was born in Sapporo on 17 October 1990. After graduating from high school, she joined for Urawa Reds in 2009. The club won L.League championship in 2009 season. In July 2011, she moved to German Bundesliga club Frankfurt. After she played 2 seasons, she moved to French Division 1 Feminine club Olympique Lyonnais in June 2013. Kumagai scored the decisive penalty for Lyon in the 2016 UEFA Champions League Final, following a player-of-the-match performance.

In April 2021, Kumagai announced that she would be leaving Lyon after 8 seasons. The following month, on 12 May 2021, Kumagai would return to the Frauen Bundesliga when FC Bayern Munich announced her as their first signing of the season.

National team career
On 7 March 2008, when Kumagai was 17 years old, she debuted for the Japan national team against Canada. In August, Kumagai was selected for the Japan U-20 national team at the 2008 U-20 World Cup. In 2010, she played for the U-20 team as captain during the 2010 U-20 World Cup. In 2011, she was part of Japan's World Cup-winning team, scoring the winning penalty in the final against the United States. She was also in the squad at the 2012 Summer Olympics and the 2015 World Cup. Japan came second at both competitions. In January 2017, she was named Japan's captain by manager Asako Takakura. In 2018, Japan won the 2018 Asian Cup. She has played more than 100 games for Japan. On 10 November 2019, Kumagai scored her first ever goal in a friendly match for Japan in a 2–0 win against South Africa.

Career statistics

Club

International

International goals
Scores and results list Japan's goal tally first, score column indicates score after each Kumagai goal.

Honours
Urawa Reds
 Nadeshiko League: 2009

Lyon 
Division 1 Féminine: 2013–14, 2014–15, 2015–16, 2016–17, 2017–18, 2018–19, 2019–20
Coupe de France: 2013–14, 2014–15, 2015–16, 2016–17, 2018–19, 2019–20
UEFA Women's Champions League: 2015–16, 2016–17, 2017–18, 2018–19, 2019–20
Trophée des Championnes: 2019
Japan
 FIFA Women's World Cup: 2011, Runner-up: 2015
 Summer Olympics Silver Medal: 2012

 AFC Women's Asian Cup: 2018

 Asian Games: 2010

 East Asian Football Championship: 2010
Japan U20

 AFC U-19 Women's Championship: 2009

Individual
 Asian Women's Footballer of the Year: 2019
IFFHS Women's World Team: 2018, 2020
 IFFHS World's Woman Team of the Decade 2011–2020
 IFFHS AFC Woman Team of the Decade 2011–2020

See also
 List of women's footballers with 100 or more caps

References

External links

 
 

Japan Football Association

1990 births
Living people
University of Tsukuba alumni
Association football people from Hokkaido
Japanese women's footballers
Japan women's international footballers
Nadeshiko League players
Division 1 Féminine players
Urawa Red Diamonds Ladies players
1. FFC Frankfurt players
Olympique Lyonnais Féminin players
Japanese expatriate footballers
Expatriate women's footballers in Germany
Japanese expatriate sportspeople in Germany
Expatriate women's footballers in France
Japanese expatriate sportspeople in France
FIFA Women's World Cup-winning players
2011 FIFA Women's World Cup players
2015 FIFA Women's World Cup players
Olympic footballers of Japan
Olympic silver medalists for Japan
Olympic medalists in football
Medalists at the 2012 Summer Olympics
Footballers at the 2012 Summer Olympics
Asian Games medalists in football
Asian Games gold medalists for Japan
Medalists at the 2010 Asian Games
Footballers at the 2010 Asian Games
Women's association football defenders
Sportspeople from Sapporo
FIFA Century Club
2019 FIFA Women's World Cup players
FC Bayern Munich (women) players
Footballers at the 2020 Summer Olympics